John & Audrey Wiggins is the self-titled debut studio album by American country music duo John & Audrey Wiggins. It was released on June 21, 1994 via Mercury Records. Although the album did not chart, its single "Has Anybody Seen Amy" reached number 22 on Hot Country Songs.

Critical reception
Bob Cannon of New Country magazine gave the debut album two-and-a-half stars out of five, saying that both siblings had strong voices that "[set] off sparks" on the songs with shared lead vocals, but that the rest of the songs were "solo numbers in country pop arrangements". Neil Pond of Country America was more favorable, saying that the album was "ever more versatile" because of the alternating male and female vocals.

Track listing

Personnel
Eddie Bayers – drums
David Briggs – piano
Clyde Carr – backing vocals
Costo Davis – keyboards
Dan Dugmore – pedal steel and resonator guitars
Paul Franklin – pedal steel and resonator guitars
Sonny Garrish – pedal steel guitar
Rob Hajacos – fiddle
Tony Haselden – electric guitar
Keith Hinton – electric guitar
Mike Lawler – keyboards
Gary Lunn - bass guitar
Randy McCormick – keyboards
Don Potter – acoustic guitar
Matt Rollings – piano
Brent Rowan – acoustic guitar
Joe Scaife – backing vocals
Billy Joe Walker, Jr. – acoustic guitar
Biff Watson – acoustic guitar
John Willis – electric guitar
Lonnie Wilson – drums
Reggie Young – electric guitar

References

1994 debut albums
Mercury Nashville albums
John & Audrey Wiggins albums